Tovah Renee Calderon (born November 1, 1972) is an American attorney serving as acting deputy assistant attorney general for the Civil Rights Division. She is a former nominee to serve as a judge of the District of Columbia Court of Appeals.

Education 
Calderon earned a Bachelor of Arts degree from the University of Michigan in 1995 and a Juris Doctor from the Howard University School of Law in 2000.

Career 
After graduating from law school, Calderon clerked for Judge Francis Dominic Murnaghan Jr. of the United States Court of Appeals for the Fourth Circuit. She then joined the United States Department of Justice, serving for over 20 years in the Civil Rights Division. She was nominated to serve as a judge of the District of Columbia Court of Appeals in June 2021. On September 14, 2021, a hearing on her nomination was held before the Senate Homeland Security and Governmental Affairs Committee. On October 6, 2021, her nomination was reported out of committee by a 7 to 6 vote. On January 3, 2022, her nomination was returned to the President under Rule XXXI, Paragraph 6 of the United States Senate; she was renominated the same day. On July 15, 2022, the White House withdrew her nomination at her request.

References 

1972 births
Living people
20th-century American women lawyers
20th-century American lawyers
21st-century American women lawyers
21st-century American lawyers
Howard University School of Law alumni
Lawyers from Washington, D.C.
People from Lafayette, Indiana
United States Department of Justice officials
United States Department of Justice lawyers
University of Michigan alumni